Tinagma hedemanni is a moth in the  family Douglasiidae. It is found in Austria, Italy and North Macedonia.

References

Moths described in 1920
Douglasiidae